India Point Railroad Bridge was a swing bridge which spanned the Seekonk River, connecting the City of Providence, Rhode Island at India Point to the City of East Providence at Watchemoket. It was last used in 1974, and the swing span was removed in 2001
leaving only two fixed truss spans.

History 
The original structure was a covered bridge built in 1835 by Thomas Hassard for the Boston and Providence Railroad. He had been mentored by Colonel Stephen H. Long, inventor of the Long truss. It was the first interstate railroad bridge built in the United States. The bridge had a manually operated draw consisting of two parts located on the East Providence side of the bridge. In order to let a vessel pass, the eastern part had to be moved northward and the western part was moved into the vacated space. In 1866, due to the bridge's piers being deemed unreliable, work began on a new bridge adjacent to the existing one that was to have a draw of at least . This bridge used a Howe truss and was built by Daniel Harris and Richard Hawkins, who held the patent rights for this design in Southern New England. On 20 February 1868, a successful test run was made, and the main track was connected to the new bridge the following day.

In 1882, an iron swing section replaced the manually operated one. However, a curve in the channel made passage through it difficult. Finally, the iron swing section was replaced with fixed pony trusses in 1903. Both of these sections were built around the existing spans, so that rail and water traffic would not be interrupted. During peak working hours, trains could cross the bridge at an average rate of one every four minutes.

Removal 
The bridge continued to operate until 1974. After its closing, the United States Coast Guard eventually determined the bridge to be a navigational hazard. In May 1990, they threatened to fine the City of Providence US$1000 for each day beyond one year from then that the bridge was neither removed nor illuminated. Though the deadline passed, the Coast Guard delayed imposing any fines until at least 1993, when Federal money was to be made available for the bridge's removal. Under the plan, the Federal government and city were each to pay US$250,000 towards the cost of removing it. However, this plan was not executed. Also, the Water Resources Acts of 1986 and 1996 had each approved plans for removing the bridge, but these plans failed to come to fruition as well.

On 18 December 2000, the Providence City Council approved the transfer of the bridge to the Federal Government. The United States Army Corps of Engineers then advertised to give the bridge to any organization that could demonstrate a suitable disposition for it. No claims were received, so demolition was scheduled to begin in October 2001. By then, the estimated removal cost had increased to US$668,690 which also had been agreed to be split evenly by the Army Corps and the city. At the end of December 2001, the swing span had been dismantled. As of February 2020, only the two fixed truss sections on the East Providence side remained. However, in the summer of 2019, the East Providence City Council had passed a resolution asking for federal help in removing these remaining sections. The Army Corps of Engineers responded by saying there is money in the fiscal year 2020 budget for an environmental review and design to remove it but not for the actual demolition costs.

See also 

Crook Point Bascule Bridge
List of bridges documented by the Historic American Engineering Record in Rhode Island
Sakonnet River rail bridge

Notes

References

External links

Information

Article about the Providence, Warren and Bristol Railroad
Another article about the bridge
Solicitation for bridge demolition

Images

Flooding from the 1938 New England hurricane
Panoramic view of the bridge

Railroad bridges in Rhode Island
Bridges in Providence County, Rhode Island
Swing bridges in the United States
Demolished bridges in the United States
Bridges completed in 1903
Buildings and structures demolished in 2001
Former railway bridges in the United States
Historic American Engineering Record in Rhode Island
1903 establishments in Rhode Island
Truss bridges in the United States
Steel bridges in the United States